Bonifacio Nguema Esono Nchama (24 April 1936 – 28 April 2015) was an Equatorial Guinean politician, known for having been Vice President of Francisco Macías Nguema and Minister of Foreign Affairs and International Cooperation.

Biography 
Nguema was born on 24 April 1936 in Mongomo, Equatorial Guinea. He was Catholic and was once mayor of Mongomo for a short time in 1982.

Career 
Before he was vice-president, he had been Government Delegate, Secretary General for Foreign Affairs, Deputy Minister and Minister of Foreign Affairs of Equatorial Guinea (acting in effect in 1976).

Vice president 
In 1978, Nguema became vice-president, by Francisco Macías Nguema, his cousin. It took more than a year before he left and calmed the rebels against the Macías' regime.

Later career 
After the Obiang coup in 1979, Nguema participated in the Supreme Military Council. In October 1979, he was decorated by Obiang and soon after became ambassador to Ethiopia.

After his career, Nguema went into exile in Spain in 1990 and co-founded the opposition party Fuerza Demócrata Republicana in 1995. He returned to Equatorial Guinea in 2015, where he was murdered in a hospital at 5 am. according to the family.

References 

1936 births
2015 deaths
People from Mongomo
Government ministers of Equatorial Guinea
Foreign ministers of Equatorial Guinea
Vice presidents of Equatorial Guinea